Arthur John Seamer  (1878–1963) was a notable New Zealand Salvation Army missionary and Methodist minister. He was born in Tongala, Victoria, Australia, in 1878.

In the 1949 King's Birthday Honours, Seamer was appointed a Companion of the Order of St Michael and St George for services in connection with mission work among the Māori.

References

1878 births
1963 deaths
New Zealand Salvationists
People from Tongala
Australian emigrants to New Zealand
New Zealand Companions of the Order of St Michael and St George
New Zealand Methodist ministers